Olaf the Red may refer to:

Amlaíb Cuarán, 10th century King of Northumbria and Dublin
Óláfr Guðrøðarson (died 1153), 12th century King of the Isles